Ediz Bahtiyaroğlu (2 January 1986 – 5 September 2012) was a Turkish football player who last played for Eskişehirspor in the Turkish Süper Lig.

International career
Bahtiyaroğlu has been capped 11 times for the Turkish national under-21 team. He announced he would play for Bosnia and Herzegovina after meeting with then national team coach Safet Sušić.

Personal life
He had Bosnian citizenship from his Bosniak father İsmail Bahtiyaroğlu (born Ismail Bahtijarević) who was born in Bosnia and Herzegovina and came to Turkey when he was 13.

Death
On 5 September 2012, Bahtiyaroğlu died in Eskişehir from a heart attack.  He was aged 26.

References

External links
 

1986 births
2012 deaths
Sportspeople from Bursa
Turkish people of Bosniak descent
Association football central defenders
Turkish footballers
Turkey under-21 international footballers
Bosnia and Herzegovina footballers
Ankaraspor footballers
Ankara Keçiörengücü S.K. footballers
MKE Ankaragücü footballers
Bucaspor footballers
Eskişehirspor footballers
TFF Third League players
Süper Lig players